Maria Beatrice d’Este (7 April 1750 – 14 November 1829) was the last descendant of the House of Este, of the House of Cybo-Malaspina and, through her maternal grandmother , also of the House of Gonzaga of Novellara and Bagnolo. Ducal princess of Modena and Reggio, she became the sovereign duchess of Massa and Carrara from 1790 until 1796 and from 1815 until her death in 1829. Through her marriage, she was co-founder of the new House of Austria-Este.

Biography

Early life
Maria Beatrice was born on 7 April 1750 in Modena. She was the eldest child of Ercole Rinaldo d'Este, heir to the Duchy of Modena and Reggio, and Maria Teresa Cybo-Malaspina, Duchess of Massa and Princess of Carrara.

Her parents' marriage was unhappy and they lived separated from each other; they only had two children: Maria Beatrice herself and Rinaldo Francesco, born on 4 January 1753. The death of Rinaldo aged four months (5 May 1753) left Maria Beatrice as the only surviving daughter and it was evident that her parents would produce no further issue. Since in Modena and Reggio (but not in Massa and Carrara) the Salic law was in force which prohibited female succession to the throne, the duke her grandfather Francis III set out to prevent the Duchy, as an imperial fief, from being simply absorbed by the Empire, just as, almost two centuries earlier, Ferrara, a papal fief, had been absorbed by the Papal State. 

Therefore, in the same year 1753, a treaty was concluded between the House of Este and the House of Austria, by which the Archduke Leopold, Empress Maria Theresa's ninth son, and Maria Beatrice were engaged, and the former was designated by Francis III as heir for the imperial investiture as Duke of Modena and Reggio in the event of extinction of the Este male line. In the meantime, Francis would cover the office of governor of Milan ad interim, which was destined for the archduke. In 1761, however, following the death of an older brother, Leopold became heir to the throne of the Grand Duchy of Tuscany as provided for the second male heir of the imperial couple, and the treaty had to be revised.

Marriage
In 1763, in spite of the harsh opposition of Maria Beatrice's father, the two families agreed to simply replace the name of Leopold with that of Maria Teresa's fourteenth son, Archduke Ferdinand Karl of Austria, who was four years younger than his betrothed. In January 1771 the Perpetual Diet of Regensburg ratified Ferdinand's future investiture and, in October, Maria Beatrice and he finally got married in Milan, thus giving rise to the new House of Austria-Este. Festivities arranged for this occasion included the operas Ascanio in Alba by Mozart and Il Ruggiero by Johann Adolph Hasse.

Francis III ceded to the archduke the post of governor of Milan which he had assumed ad interim after the 1753 agreement and which was destined for the third male heir of the imperial couple. The new archducal couple, for their part, settled in Milan where they lived nearly 25 years producing, to the delight of Maria Theresa, a large offspring of ten children.

Duchess regnant
When Maria Beatrice's mother died in 1790, she succeeded her as Duchess of Massa and Carrara, but, despite turning out to be a scrupulous administrator, she never moved to her new duchy. 

After the French conquest of Northern Italy, she spent her life mostly in Austria, eventually at the imperial court of her nephew-in-law Francis II/I, in Vienna. In 1808 she also became his mother-in-law following his marriage to her youngest daughter, Maria Ludovika. She had previously been mother-in-law of the late Elector Charles Theodore of Bavaria, through marriage of another of her daughters Maria Leopoldine, and was still mother-in-law of King Victor Emmanuel I of Sardinia, through marriage of her eldest daughter Maria Theresa. In 1812, her eldest son and heir, the future Francis IV, Duke of Modena, in turn married his own niece, Maria Beatrice of Savoy, daughter of the latter-mentioned Maria Theresa.

In accordance with the 'principle of legitimacy' advocated by Metternich at the Congress of Vienna, Maria Beatrice was restored as sovereign of the 'Duchy of Massa and Principality of Carrara' in 1815, and the Imperial fiefs in Lunigiana, which had not been re-established, were also bestowed upon her. With an agreement in December, however, she ceded them to her son Francis IV who had been installed on the throne of the Duchy of Modena and Reggio, as heir to his father Ferdinand, in turn held to be the legal successor of Ercole III. 

On her death, in 1829, she too was succeeded as ruler of Massa and Carrara by Francis IV, who in a few years completely assimilated the ancient Tuscan duchy within the 'Este States' (Stati Estensi), as his Duchy was officially styled. The House of Austria-Este was to rule Modena until 1859.

Issue

Ancestry

References

External links

1750 births
1829 deaths
House of Este
House of Habsburg
Austria-Este
Cybo-Malaspina
Modenese princesses
Austrian princesses
Dukes of Massa
Princes of Carrara
18th-century women rulers
19th-century women rulers
18th-century Italian people
19th-century Italian people
18th-century Italian women
19th-century Italian women
Burials at the Imperial Crypt